School of the Future can refer to:

School of the Future (New York City)
School of the Future (Philadelphia)
School of the Future (Sao Paulo - Brasil)
School of the Future (Yalta)